Mukhametshin is a Russian Tatar surname. The feminine form is Mukhametshina. Among those with this name are:

Farid Mukhametshin (b. 1947), politician, former Prime Minister of Tatarstan
Farit Mukhametshin (b. 1947), politician and diplomat
Igor Mukhametshin (b. 1963), naval officer
Ruslan Mukhametshin (b. 1981), footballer and coach
Rustem Mukhametshin (b. 1984), footballer

Russian-language surnames